Montpellier is a future Réseau express métropolitain station, expected to open in the fourth quarter of 2024. It is located in Montreal, Quebec, Canada. Until May 2020, the station was a commuter rail station operated by Exo on the Deux-Montagnes line.

Origin of name
Prior to the modernization of the Deux-Montagnes line, between 1993 and 1995, the station was called Vertu because of its location on Côte-Vertu Boulevard. One of the reasons the name was changed was to avoid confusion with the  metro station, which opened in 1986. The current name,  Montpellier, comes from the name of a nearby street and shopping mall. Another option for a station name was Saint-Laurent, but this was not chosen in order to avoid confusion with the existing Saint-Laurent Montreal metro station.

Location
The station is located at 465 Côte-Vertu Boulevard in Saint-Laurent between the intersections of Côte-Vertu/Jules-Poitras Boul. and of Côte-Vertu/Muir St.

Connecting bus routes

References

External links
 
  Montpellier Commuter Train Station Information (RTM)
  Montpellier Commuter Train Station Schedule (RTM)
 2016 STM System Map

Former Exo commuter rail stations
Railway stations in Montreal
Saint-Laurent, Quebec
1918 establishments in Quebec
Railway stations in Canada opened in 1918
Réseau express métropolitain railway stations